Ordway is a Statutory Town in and the county seat of Crowley County, Colorado, United States, that is also the most populous community in the county. The population was 1,080 at the 2010 census.

History
A post office called Ordway has been in operation since 1890. The community was named after George N. Ordway, a Denver politician.

Geography
Ordway is located in south-central Crowley County at  (38.219633, -103.757264). State Highway 96 runs along the southern edge of the town, leading west  to Pueblo and east  to Eads. Highway 71 runs along the eastern edge of the town and leads south  to U.S. Route 50 near Rocky Ford and north  to Interstate 70 at Limon.

Demographics

As of the census of 2000, there were 1,248 people, 485 households, and 317 families residing in the town. The racial makeup of the town was 84.78% White, 0.40% African American, 2.48% Native American, 0.40% Asian, 9.21% from other races, and 2.72% from two or more races. Hispanic or Latino of any race were 31.25% of the population.

There were 485 households, out of which 33.6% had children under the age of 18 living with them, 45.2% were married couples living together, 14.8% had a female householder with no husband present, and 34.6% were non-families. 31.5% of all households were made up of individuals, and 17.5% had someone living alone who was 65 years of age or older. The average household size was 2.47 and the average family size was 3.09.

In the town, the population was spread out, with 28.8% under the age of 18, 8.6% from 18 to 24, 24.4% from 25 to 44, 19.8% from 45 to 64, and 18.5% who were 65 years of age or older. The median age was 37 years. For every 100 females, there were 90.5 males. For every 100 females age 18 and over, there were 82.2 males.

The median income for a household in the town was $23,967, and the median income for a family was $29,107. Males had a median income of $25,139 versus $26,607 for females. The per capita income for the town was $14,334. About 20.0% of families and 21.4% of the population were below the poverty line, including 26.8% of those under age 18 and 13.4% of those age 65 or over.

See also

 List of municipalities in Colorado

References

External links

 Town of Ordway contacts
 CDOT map of the Town of Ordway

Towns in Crowley County, Colorado
Towns in Colorado
County seats in Colorado